NGC 184 is a spiral galaxy located in the constellation Andromeda. It was discovered on October 6, 1883 by Édouard Stephan.

References

External links 
 

0184
Lenticular galaxies
Andromeda (constellation)
Astronomical objects discovered in 1883
Discoveries by Édouard Stephan
002309